The 1810 United States elections occurred in the middle of Democratic-Republican President James Madison's first term, during the First Party System. Members of the 12th United States Congress were chosen in this election. During the 12th Congress, Louisiana joined the union. Democratic-Republicans continued to control both chambers of Congress.

In the House, Democratic-Republicans picked up a moderate number of seats, increasing their already-dominant majority.

In the Senate, Democratic-Republicans won a small number of seats, increasing their commanding majority.

See also
1810–11 United States House of Representatives elections
1810–11 United States Senate elections

References

1810 elections in the United States
1810
United States midterm elections